The following table shows comparative officer ranks of several Allied and Central powers during World War I.

Table

See also
Comparative officer ranks of World War II
Rank insignia of the Imperial Russian Army 1917

Notes

References

 
 
 
 
 
 
 

World War I
Military comparisons